Stanley Holmes can refer to:
Joseph Stanley Holmes, 1st Baron Dovercourt (1878–1961), British Liberal politician, Member of Parliament 1918–22 and 1935–1954
John Stanley Holmes, British Liberal politician, unsuccessful candidate for Tynemouth (UK Parliament constituency) in 1931 and 1935
Stan Holmes (1960–2011), American baseball player